Benjamin John Whitrow (17 February 1937 – 28 September 2017) was an English actor. He was nominated for the BAFTA TV Award for Best Actor for his role as Mr Bennet in the 1995 BBC version of Pride and Prejudice, and voiced the role of Fowler in the 2000 animated film Chicken Run. His other film appearances include Quadrophenia (1979), Personal Services (1987) and Bomber (2009).

Early life and education
Whitrow was born on 17 February 1937 in Oxford, Oxfordshire, the son of Mary Alexandra (Flaunders) and Philip Whitrow, a teacher at St Edward's School, Oxford.

Whitrow attended two independent schools: The Dragon School in Oxford and Tonbridge School, in the town of Tonbridge in Kent, followed by the Royal Academy of Dramatic Art.

Life and career
Whitrow served in the King's Dragoon Guards during his national service from 1956 to 1958. He joined the Royal Shakespeare Company in 1981. He played Russell in the original radio version of After Henry by Simon Brett.

A lifelong fan of the writings of the English author Denton Welch, he was instrumental in bringing the third, revised version of Welch's journals to print in 1984, having made the acquaintance of one of Welch's friends who had possessed the manuscript of the original editor's edition.

In 1989, Whitrow appeared in episode four of the BBC Two sketch show A Bit of Fry and Laurie (series one), playing an irate member of the audience who claimed that Stephen Fry and Hugh Laurie had stolen several of their sketches from him.

Between 1990 and 1992, Whitrow appeared in the sitcom The New Statesman as Paddy O'Rourke, a Labour shadow minister who feigned an Irish accent when in public to attract the working-class vote.

Whitrow was nominated for the BAFTA TV Award for Best Actor for his portrayal of Mr Bennet in the 1995 adaptation of Pride and Prejudice.

In the 2000 animated movie Chicken Run Whitrow voiced the character of Fowler, an old rooster who claims to have fought in World War II.

Whitrow's last work was two plays for BBC Radio 4, in which he played the late Poet Laureate Sir John Betjeman.  Mr Betjeman's Class was his last completed work; he died during the recording of Mr Betjeman Regrets, with the voice work being completed by Robert Bathurst.  Both plays were broadcast on BBC Radio 4 over Christmas 2017.

Personal life
Whitrow was married to Catherine Cook, with whom he had two children: Hannah Mary Whitrow (b. 1973) and Thomas George Whitrow (b. 1976).  He also had a son, Angus Imrie (b. 1994) with actress Celia Imrie.

Whitrow died from a brain hemorrhage in Wimbledon, London on 28 September 2017, aged 80.

Select filmography

Film
1963: The Small World of Sammy Lee as Joan's Client (uncredited)
1963: West 11 as Minor Role (uncredited)
1979: Quadrophenia as Mr. Fulford, Jimmy's Boss
1982: Brimstone and Treacle as Businessman
1986: Clockwise as Headmaster #1
1987: Personal Services as Mr. Marsden
1988: Hawks as Mr. Granger
1988: On the Black Hill as Arkwright
1988: A Man for All Seasons as Thomas Cromwell
1992: Damage as Civil Servant
1992: Chaplin as Station Master
1995: Restoration as Merivel's Father
1997: The Opium War as Lord Palmerston
1997: The Saint as Chairman at Oxford
1997: FairyTale: A True Story as Mr. Binley
1998: Jilting Joe as Arthur
2000: Chicken Run as Fowler (voice)
2006: Scenes of a Sexual Nature as Eddie Wright
2009: Bomber as Alistar
2017: Darkest Hour as Sir Samuel Hoare (final film role)

Television

1973: The Merchant of Venice (TV Movie) as the Duke of Venice (opposite Laurence Olivier as Shylock)
1973: The Brontes of Haworth as Arthur Bell Nicholls
1975-1981: Play for Today as James Sellars / Phillips / Tom / House Master / Josh
1978: The Sweeney as Det. Chief Supt. Braithwaite
1981: Bognor as Eric Gringe
1981: Troilus and Cressida (TV Movie) as Ulysses
1982: Tales of the Unexpected as Fergus Locke
1982: Harry's Game as Davidson
1983: Shackleton as Captain Scott
1983: Agatha Christie's Partners in Crime as Sir Arthur Merivale
1984: Hay Fever (TV Movie) as Richard Greatham
1985: Dempsey & Makepeace (TV Movie) as Lindsay
1985: Bergerac as B J Farrell
1990: Chancer as Robert Douglas
1991: Rumpole of the Bailey as The Reverend Bill Britwell
1991-1992: The New Statesman as Paddy O'Rourke
1995: Pride and Prejudice as Mr Bennet
1996: Inspector Morse as Brownlee
1997: The History of Tom Jones: A Foundling as Squire Allworthy
2001-2009: Midsomer Murders as Sir Malcolm Frazer / Hugo Balcombe
2005: The Queen's Sister (TV Movie) as Cronin
2006: Agatha Christie's Poirot (Episode: "After the Funeral") Timothy Abernathy
2014: New Tricks as Edward Fraser
2015: Toast of London as Ken Suggestion
2015: Man Down as Tim
2015: ‘’ Wolf Hall’’ as Arch Bishop

Radio
1980: Unman, Wittering & Zigo as the headmaster; by Giles Cooper; BBC R4 7/8/1980.
1984: Dracula in White by Peter Redgrove; BBC R4 7/3/1984.
1984: Tragedy at Law as the Judge; by Cyril Hare; BBC Radio 4 Saturday Night Theatre 7/4/1984.
1985–1989: After Henry as Russell; BBC Radio 4 series by Simon Brett.
1992: A Warden for All Saints as James Montague, by H.S. Bhabra; BBC R4 29 April 1992.
1995: In The Red as the bank manager murderer; by Mark Tavener; BBC Radio 4 series 5/1/1995-16/2/1995.
1997: MR James Ghost story readings – The Late Book.
1999: Plum's War by Michael Butt, BBC R4 7/7/99.
2003: Brideshead Revisited by Evelyn Waugh, dramatised by Jeremy Front, BBC R4 8/3/2003.
2003: The Last Bark of the Bulldog by Jonathan Smith; Benjamin Whitrow portrays Winston Churchill; BBC R4 21 June 2003.
2011: Portrait of Winston, by Jonathan Smith; sequel to The Last Bark of the Bulldog; BBC R4 13 September 2011
2017: Mr Betjeman's Class and Mr Betjeman Regrets both by Jonathan Smith; BBC R4 25 December 2017 and 26 December 2017

References

External links
 Benjamin Whitrow at bbc.co.uk Drama
 

1937 births
2017 deaths
20th-century English male actors
21st-century English male actors
Actors from Oxford
Alumni of RADA
English male film actors
English male stage actors
English male Shakespearean actors
English male radio actors
English male television actors
English male voice actors
Male actors from Kent
Male actors from Oxfordshire
People educated at The Dragon School
People educated at Tonbridge School
1st King's Dragoon Guards soldiers